Ariane 5 is a European heavy-lift space launch vehicle developed and operated by Arianespace for the European Space Agency (ESA). It is launched from the Centre Spatial Guyanais (CSG) in French Guiana. It has been used to deliver payloads into geostationary transfer orbit (GTO) or low Earth orbit (LEO). The launch vehicle had a streak of 82 consecutive successful launches between 9 April 2003 and 12 December 2017. Since 2014, Ariane 6, a direct successor system, is in development.

The system was designed as an expendable launch system by the Centre national d'études spatiales (CNES), the French government's space agency, in cooperation with various European partners. Despite not being a direct derivative of its predecessor launch vehicle program, it is classified as part of the Ariane rocket family. ArianeGroup is the prime contractor for the manufacturing of the vehicles, leading a multi-country consortium of other European contractors. Ariane 5 was originally intended to launch the Hermes spacecraft, and thus it is rated for human space launches.

Since its first launch, Ariane 5 has been refined in successive versions: "G", "G+", "GS", "ECA", and most recently, "ES". The system has a commonly used dual-launch capability, where up to two large geostationary belt communication satellites can be mounted using a SYLDA (Système de Lancement Double Ariane, meaning "Ariane Double-Launch System") carrier system. Up to three, somewhat smaller, main satellites are possible depending on size using a SPELTRA (Structure Porteuse Externe Lancement Triple Ariane, which translates to "Ariane Triple-Launch External Carrier Structure"). Up to eight secondary payloads, usually small experiment packages or minisatellites, can be carried with an ASAP (Ariane Structure for Auxiliary Payloads) platform.

Following the launch of 15 August 2020, Arianespace signed the contracts for the last eight Ariane 5 launches, before it is succeeded by the new Ariane 6 launcher, according to Daniel Neuenschwander, director of space transportation at the ESA.

Vehicle description

Cryogenic main stage 

Ariane 5's cryogenic H173 main stage (H158 for Ariane 5G, G+, and GS) is called the EPC (Étage Principal Cryotechnique — Cryotechnic Main Stage). After the main cryogenic stage runs out of fuel, it re-enters the atmosphere for an ocean splashdown.

Solid boosters 
They are fueled by a mix of ammonium perchlorate (68%) and aluminium fuel (18%) and HTPB (14%). They each burn for 130 seconds before being dropped into the ocean. The SRBs are usually allowed to sink to the bottom of the ocean, but, like the Space Shuttle Solid Rocket Boosters, they can be recovered with parachutes, and this has occasionally been done for post-flight analysis. Unlike Space Shuttle SRBs, Ariane 5 boosters are not reused. The most recent attempt was for the first Ariane 5 ECA mission in 2009. One of the two boosters was successfully recovered and returned to the Guiana Space Center for analysis. Prior to that mission, the last such recovery and testing was done in 2003.

The French M51 submarine-launched ballistic missile (SLBM) shares a substantial amount of technology with these boosters.

In February 2000, the suspected nose cone of an Ariane 5 booster washed ashore on the South Texas coast, and was recovered by beachcombers before the government could get to it.

Second stage 

The second stage is on top of the main stage and below the payload. The original Ariane — Ariane 5G — used the EPS (Étage à Propergols Stockables — Storable Propellant Stage), which was fueled by monomethylhydrazine (MMH) and nitrogen tetroxide, containing  of storable propellant. The EPS was subsequently improved for use on the Ariane 5G+, GS, and ES.

The EPS upper stage is capable of repeated ignition, first demonstrated during flight V26 which was launched on 5 October 2007. This was purely to test the engine, and occurred after the payloads had been deployed. The first operational use of restart capability as part of a mission came on 9 March 2008, when two burns were made to deploy the first Automated Transfer Vehicle (ATV) into a circular parking orbit, followed by a third burn after ATV deployment to de-orbit the stage. This procedure was repeated for all subsequent ATV flights.

Ariane 5ECA uses the ESC (Étage Supérieur Cryotechnique — Cryogenic Upper Stage), which is fueled by liquid hydrogen and liquid oxygen. The ESC uses the HM7B engine previously used in the Ariane 4 third stage. The propellent load of 14.7 tonne allows the engine to burn for 945 seconds while providing 6.5 tonne of thrust. The ESC provides roll control during powered flight and full attitude control during payload separation using hydrogen gas thrusters. Oxygen gas thrusters allow longitudinal acceleration after engine cutoff. The flight assembly includes the Vehicle Equipment Bay, with flight electronics for the entire rocket, and the payload interface and structural support.

Fairing 
The payload and all upper stages are covered at launch by a fairing for aerodynamic stability and protection from heating during supersonic flight and acoustic loads. It is jettisoned once sufficient altitude has been reached, typically above . It is made by Ruag Space and since flight VA-238 it is composed of 4 panels.

Variants 

Launch system status:

Launch pricing and market competition 
, the Ariane 5 commercial launch price for launching a "midsize satellite in the lower position" was approximately €50 million, competing for commercial launches in an increasingly competitive market.

The heavier satellite is launched in the upper position on a typical dual-satellite Ariane 5 launch and is priced higher than the lower satellite, on the order of €90 million .

Total launch price of an Ariane 5 – which can transport up to two satellites to space, one in the "upper" and one in the "lower" positions – was around €150 million .

Cancelled plans for future developments

Ariane 5 ME 
The Ariane 5 ME (Mid-life Evolution) was in development into early 2015, and was seen as a stopgap between Ariane 5ECA/Ariane 5ES and the new Ariane 6. With first flight planned for 2018, it would have become ESA's principal launcher until the arrival of the new Ariane 6 version. ESA halted funding for the development of Ariane 5ME in late 2014 to prioritize development of Ariane 6.

The Ariane 5ME was to use a new upper stage, with increased propellant volume, powered by the new Vinci engine. Unlike the HM-7B engine, it was to be able to restart several times, allowing for complex orbital maneuvers such as insertion of two satellites into different orbits, direct insertion into geosynchronous orbit, planetary exploration missions, and guaranteed upper stage deorbiting or insertion into graveyard orbit.

Development 
Originally known as the Ariane 5ECB, Ariane 5ME was to have its first flight in 2006. However, the failure of the first ECA flight in 2002, combined with a deteriorating satellite industry, caused ESA to cancel development in 2003. Development of the Vinci engine continued, though at a lower pace. The ESA Council of Ministers agreed to fund development of the new upper stage in November 2008.

In 2009, EADS Astrium was awarded a €200 million contract, and on 10 April 2012 received another €112 million contract to continue development of the Ariane 5ME  with total development effort expected to cost €1 billion.

On 21 November 2012, ESA agreed to continue with the Ariane 5ME to meet the challenge of lower priced competitors. It was agreed the Vinci upper stage would also be used as the second stage of a new Ariane 6, and further commonality would be sought. Ariane 5ME qualification flight was scheduled for mid-2018, followed by gradual introduction into service.

On 2 December 2014, ESA decided to stop funding the development of Ariane 5ME and instead focus on Ariane 6, which was expected to have a lower cost per launch and allow more flexibility in the payloads (using two or four P120C solid boosters depending on total payload mass).

Solid propellant stage 
Work on the Ariane 5 EAP motors has been continued in the Vega programme. The Vega 1st stage engine – the P80 engine – is a shorter derivation of the EAP. The P80 booster casing is made of filament wound graphite epoxy, much lighter than the current stainless steel casing. A new composite steerable nozzle has been developed while new thermal insulation material and a narrower throat improve the expansion ratio and subsequently the overall performance. Additionally, the nozzle now has electromechanical actuators which have replaced the heavier hydraulic ones used for thrust vector control.

These developments will probably later make their way back into the Ariane programme. The incorporation of the ESC-B with the improvements to the solid motor casing and an uprated Vulcain engine would deliver  to LEO. This would be developed for any lunar missions but the performance of such a design may not be possible if the higher Max-Q for the launch of this launch vehicle poses a constraint on the mass delivered to orbit.

Ariane 6 

However, after several permutations the finalized design was nearly identical in performance to the Ariane 5, focusing instead on lowering fabrication costs and launch prices. , Ariane 6 was projected to be launched for about €70 million per flight, about half of the Ariane 5 price.

Initially development of Ariane 6 was projected to cost €3.6 billion. In 2017, the ESA set 16 July 2020 as the deadline for the first flight. As of June 2022, Arianespace expects the maiden flight to occur in 2023.

Notable launches 

Ariane 5's first test flight (Ariane 5 Flight 501) on 4 June 1996 failed, with the rocket self-destructing 37 seconds after launch because of a malfunction in the control software. A data conversion from 64-bit floating-point value to 16-bit signed integer value to be stored in a variable representing horizontal bias caused a processor trap (operand error) because the floating-point value was too large to be represented by a 16-bit signed integer. The software had been written for the Ariane 4 where efficiency considerations (the computer running the software had an 80% maximum workload requirement) led to four variables being protected with a handler while three others, including the horizontal bias variable, were left unprotected because it was thought that they were "physically limited or that there was a large margin of safety". The software, written in Ada, was included in the Ariane 5 through the reuse of an entire Ariane 4 subsystem despite the fact that the particular software containing the bug, which was just a part of the subsystem, was not required by the Ariane 5 because it has a different preparation sequence than the Ariane 4.

The second test flight (L502, on 30 October 1997) was a partial failure. The Vulcain nozzle caused a roll problem, leading to premature shutdown of the core stage. The upper stage operated successfully, but it could not reach the intended orbit. A subsequent test flight (L503, on 21 October 1998) proved successful and the first commercial launch (L504) occurred on 10 December 1999 with the launch of the XMM-Newton X-ray observatory satellite.

Another partial failure occurred on 12 July 2001, with the delivery of two satellites into an incorrect orbit, at only half the height of the intended GTO. The ESA Artemis telecommunications satellite was able to reach its intended orbit on 31 January 2003, through the use of its experimental ion propulsion system.

The first launch of the ECA variant on 11 December 2002 ended in failure when a main booster problem caused the rocket to veer off-course, forcing its self-destruction three minutes into the flight. Its payload of two communications satellites (STENTOR and Hot Bird 7), valued at about €630 million, was lost in the Atlantic Ocean. The fault was determined to have been caused by a leak in coolant pipes allowing the nozzle to overheat. After this failure, Arianespace SA delayed the expected January 2003 launch for the Rosetta mission to 26 February 2004, but this was again delayed to early March 2004 due to a minor fault in the foam that protects the cryogenic tanks on the Ariane 5. As of June 2017, the failure of the first ECA launch was the last failure of an Ariane 5; since then, 82 consecutive launches have been successful, from April 2003 with the launch of INSAT-3A and Galaxy 12 satellites, to flight 240 in December 2017.

On 27 September 2003, the last Ariane 5G boosted three satellites (including the first European lunar probe, SMART-1), in Flight 162. On 18 July 2004, an Ariane 5G+ boosted what was at the time the heaviest telecommunication satellite ever, Anik F2, weighing almost .

The first successful launch of the Ariane 5ECA took place on 12 February 2005. The payload consisted of the XTAR-EUR military communications satellite, a 'SLOSHSAT' small scientific satellite and a MaqSat B2 payload simulator. The launch had been scheduled for October 2004, but additional testing and a military launch (of a Helios 2A observation satellite) delayed the attempt.

On 16 November 2005, the third Ariane 5ECA launch (the second successful ECA launch) took place. It carried a dual payload consisting of Spaceway F2 for DirecTV and Telkom-2 for PT Telekomunikasi of Indonesia.

The dual-payload consisted of the Thaicom 5 and Satmex 6 satellites.

This record was again broken by another Ariane 5ECA, launching the Skynet 5B and Star One C1 satellites, on 11 November 2007.

On 9 March 2008, the first Ariane 5ES-ATV was launched to deliver the first ATV called Jules Verne to the International Space Station (ISS). The ATV was the heaviest payload ever launched by a European launch vehicle, providing supplies to the space station with necessary propellant, water, air and dry cargo. This was the first operational Ariane mission which involved an engine restart in the upper stage. The ES-ATV Aestus EPS upper stage was restartable while the ECA HM7-B engine was not.

On 28 October 2010, an Ariane 5ECA launched Eutelsat's W3B (part of its W Series of satellites) and Broadcasting Satellite System Corporation (B-SAT)'s BSAT-3b satellites into orbit. But the W3B satellite failed to operate shortly after the successful launch and was written off as a total loss due to an oxidizer leak in the satellite's main propulsion system. The BSAT-3b satellite, however, is operating normally.

It also debuted a location system using Galileo navigation satellites.

On 25 December 2021, VA256 launched the James Webb Space Telescope towards a Sun–Earth L2 halo orbit. The precision of trajectory following launch led to fuel savings credited with potentially doubling the lifetime of the telescope by leaving more hydrazine propellant on-board for station-keeping than was expected. According to Rudiger Albat, the program manager for Ariane 5, efforts had been made to select components for this flight that had performed especially well during pre-flight testing, including "one of the best Vulcain engines that we've ever built."

GTO payload weight records 
This record was later broken again during the launch of Ariane 5ECA flight VA-208 on 2 August 2012, lifting a total of  into the planned geosynchronous transfer orbit, which was broken again 6 months later on flight VA-212 with  sent towards geosynchronous transfer orbit. On 1 June 2017, the payload record was broken again to  carrying ViaSat-2 and Eutelsat-172B. In 2021 VA-255 put 11,210 kg into GTO.

VA241 anomaly 

On 25 January 2018, an Ariane 5ECA launched SES-14 and Al Yah 3 satellites. About 9 minutes and 28 seconds after launch, a telemetry loss occurred between the launch vehicle and the ground controllers. It was later confirmed, about 1 hour and 20 minutes after launch, that both satellites were successfully separated from the upper stage and were in contact with their respective ground controllers, but that their orbital inclinations were incorrect as the guidance systems might have been compromised. Therefore, both satellites conducted orbital procedures, extending commissioning time. SES-14 needed about 8 weeks longer than planned commissioning time, meaning that entry into service was reported early September instead of July. Nevertheless, SES-14 is still expected to be able to meet the designed lifetime. This satellite was originally to be launched with more propellant reserve on a Falcon 9 launch vehicle since the Falcon 9, in this specific case, was intended to deploy this satellite into a high inclination orbit that would require more work from the satellite to reach its final geostationary orbit. The Al Yah 3 was also confirmed healthy after more than 12 hours without further statement, and like SES-14, Al Yah 3's maneuvering plan was also revised to still fulfill the original mission. As of 16 February 2018, Al Yah 3 was approaching the intended geostationary orbit, after series of recovery maneuvers had been performed. The investigation showed that invalid inertial units' azimuth value had sent the vehicle 17° off course but to the intended altitude, they had been programmed for the standard geostationary transfer orbit of 90° when the payloads were intended to be 70° for this supersynchronous transfer orbit mission, 20° off norme. This mission anomaly marked the end of 82nd consecutive success streak since 2003.

Launch history

Launch statistics 
Ariane 5 launch vehicles have accumulated 115 launches since 1996, 110 of which were successful, yielding a  success rate. Between April 2003 and December 2017, Ariane 5 flew 83 consecutive missions without failure, but the launch vehicle suffered a partial failure in January 2018.

Rocket configurations

Launch outcomes

List of launches 

All launches are from Centre Spatial Guyanais (CSG), Kourou, ELA-3.

Future payloads and scheduled flights

See also 

 List of Ariane launches
 Ariane 6, two initial variants
 Heavy-lift launch vehicle
 Comparison of orbital launchers families
 Comparison of orbital launch systems
 Future Launchers Preparatory Programme (ESA, beyond Ariane 5)

References

External links 
 Ariane 5 Overview at Arianespace
 Ariane 5 Programme Information at Astrium

Ariane (rocket family)
Articles containing video clips
Vehicles introduced in 1996